Lafayette or La Fayette is an unincorporated community in Linn County, in the U.S. state of Iowa.

History
 In 1845, settler John Nevins built a sawmill in what later became the village of Lafayette. This mill was later passed down to new owners John Lambert, James Greene, and A. Brenaman, then Fred Notebahn. Notebahn added a grist mill.

By 1856, Lafayette was listed as a town in N.H. Parker's Handbook of Iowa. In 1871, a coal deposit was discovered near Lafayette; a mining company was established, but proved unprofitable, with the shafts flooded with water and the coal deposit "not exceeding an inch in thickness".

The Lafayette post office was established in 1891.

The community's population was 50 in 1890, 53 in 1900, and 52 in 1920. 

The Lafayette post office was discontinued in 1902.

The community's population was 50 in 1940.

Lafayette is home to the Lafayette Christian Church and the Lafayette Salem Evangelical Church, the later of which celebrated its centennial around 2001.

References

Unincorporated communities in Linn County, Iowa
Unincorporated communities in Iowa